Baghal was one of the Princely states of India during the period of the British Raj. Baghal was founded by Rana Aje De in 1310-40 and was acceded to India on 15 April 1948.

The capital of Baghal was Arki. Bangahal were originally Brahmins who changed their varna to Kshatriya.

History
The state of Baghal was founded around 1640.

Rulers
The rulers of Baghal bore the title 'Raja' from 1860 onward.

Ranas 
1670 - 1727                Prithvi Chand                      (d. 1727) 
1727 - 1743                Mehar Chand                        (d. 1743) 
1743 - 1778                Bhup Chand                         (d. 1778) 
1778 - 1805                Jagat Singh (1st time)             (d. 1828) (exiled in Nalagarh 1805 - 1815) 
1805 - 1815                occupied by Nepal 
3 Sep 1815 - Aug 1828     Jagat Singh (2nd time)             (s.a.) 
1828 - 16 Jan 1840         Shiv Saran Singh                   (b. 1793 - d. 1840) 
1840 - 12 Mar 1875         Kishan Singh                       (b. 1817 - d. 1877) (personal style Raja from 1860)

Rajas 
12 Mar 1875 – 23 Jul 1877  Kishan Singh                       (s.a.) 
23 Jul 1877 – 12 Oct 1877  Moti Singh                         (d. 1877) 
1877 - 1904                Dhian Singh                        (b. 1842 - d. 1904) 
23 Apr 1904 -  3 Oct 1922  Bikram Singh                       (b. 1893 - d. 1922) 
 3 Oct 1922 – 21 Dec 1945  Surendra Singh                     (b. 1909 - d. 1945) 
21 Dec 1945 – 15 Aug 1947  Rajendra Singh                     (b. 1928 - d. 2010)

See also
Kangra painting

Gallery

References

History of Himachal Pradesh
Rajputs
14th-century establishments in India
1310s establishments in Asia
1948 disestablishments in India
Princely states of India